Getachew (Amharic: ጌታቸው) is a male given name of Ethiopian origin that may refer to:

Getachew Reda (born 1974), Ethiopian politician and member of the executive committee of the TPLF
Getachew Abate (1895–1952), Ethiopian army commander and nobleman
Helen Getachew (born 1990), Ethiopian beauty pageant contestant
Getatchew Mekurya (1935-2016), Ethiopian jazz saxophonist

Ethiopian given names
Amharic-language names